We Are Boats is a 2018 American fantasy film written and directed by James Bird and starring Angela Sarafyan, Adriana Mather, Justin Cornwell, Luke Hemsworth, Jack Falahee, Gaia Weiss, Booboo Stewart, Graham Greene, Amanda Plummer and Uzo Aduba.

Cast
Angela Sarafyan as Francesca
Luke Hemsworth as Lucas
Amanda Plummer as Jimmie
Adriana Mather as Ryan
Justin Cornwell as Freddie
Jack Falahee as Michael Lamina
Gaia Weiss as Rachel
Booboo Stewart as Taylor
Graham Greene as Cliff
Uzo Aduba as Sir

Reception

References

External links
 
 

American fantasy films
2010s English-language films
2010s American films